Robert Joseph Mullens (November 1, 1922 – July 22, 1989) was an American professional basketball player. An All-American at Fordham University, Mullens played one full season in the Basketball Association of America (which merged with the National Basketball League in 1949 to create the National Basketball Association), splitting the 1946–47 season between the New York Knicks and the Toronto Huskies.

Mullens played high school basketball at Brooklyn Prep, where he was a prodigious scorer, setting the New York City Catholic League scoring mark. Upon graduation, Mullens chose hometown Fordham. At Fordham, Mullens led the Rams to the 1943 National Invitation Tournament semifinals and at the close of the season was named an All-American by Sporting News magazine and the Helms Athletic Foundation.

Mullens later was a player in the inaugural season of the BAA. He started the season with the New York Knicks, averaging 2.9 points in 26 games. He was traded to the Toronto Huskies for fellow Fordham alumnus Bob Fitzgerald on January 21, 1947. With the Huskies, he averaged 8.5 points per game in 28 contests.

Following the close of his professional basketball career, Mullens became a bond specialist in New York City. He died on July 22, 1989 in Staten Island, New York.

BAA career statistics

Regular season

References

1922 births
1989 deaths
All-American college men's basketball players
American expatriate basketball people in Canada
American men's basketball players
Basketball players from New York City
Brooklyn Preparatory School alumni
Fordham Rams men's basketball players
Guards (basketball)
New York Knicks players
Sportspeople from Brooklyn
Toronto Huskies players